Snezhinsk is a closed town in Chelyabinsk Oblast, Russia. Population:

History
The settlement began in 1955 as Residential settlement number 2, a name which it had until 1957 when it received town status. It was successively known as Kasli-2 (1957–1959), Chelyabinsk-50 (1959–1966), and Chelyabinsk-70 (1966–1993), after the relatively close city of Chelyabinsk. During the Soviet era, Snezhinsk was a closed city: it was not shown on maps and civil overflights were forbidden.

Administrative and municipal status
Within the framework of administrative divisions, it is, together with two rural localities, incorporated as the Town of Snezhinsk—an administrative unit with the status equal to that of the districts. As a municipal division, the Town of Snezhinsk is incorporated as Snezhinsky Urban Okrug.

Science
Snezhinsk is one of two centers of the Russian nuclear program (the other is Sarov) and is built around a scientific research institute—"All-Russian Scientific Research Institute Of Technical Physics".

International relations
Snezhinsk is a sister city of Livermore, California, United States.

See also
List of closed cities

References

Notes

Sources

External links
Website of Snezhinsk 
Pictures Snezhinsk 
More pictures of Snezhinsk

Cities and towns in Chelyabinsk Oblast
Closed cities
Nuclear weapons program of the Soviet Union
Naukograds